{{Infobox film
| name           = Prehistoric Beast
| image          = Prehistoric-Beast 2011-rerelease Tippett-Studio.jpg
| alt            = 
| caption        = Prehistoric Beasts rerelease online poster (Tippett Studio, 2011).
| director       = Phil Tippett
| producer       = Phil Tippett
| writer         = Phil Tippett
| starring       = 
| music          = Mark Adler
| cinematography = Phil TippettTerry Chostner
| editing        = Julie Roman
| studio         = Tippett Studio
| distributor    = 
| released       = 1985
| runtime        = 10 minutes
| country        = United States
| language       = 
| budget         =
| gross          = 
}}Prehistoric Beast is a ten-minute-long experimental animated film conceived, supervised and directed by Phil Tippett in 1984. This sequence is the first film produced by the Tippett Studio, founded by Tippett. Made with the go motion animation technique, scenes from Prehistoric Beast were included in the 1985 full-length documentary Dinosaur!, first aired on CBS in the United States on November 5, 1985.

Content
Set 65 million years ago in what is now the Canadian province of Alberta, this short film depicts the chase and predation of a Monoclonius (also known as Centrosaurus --the synonym name-- see below) by a Tyrannosaurus rex (or a closely related genus; see below). The short opens with a tracking shot in the middle of a forest at night: the Tyrannosaurus rex is busy eating and finishing an Edmontosaurus carcass. The next morning, a herd of Monoclonius is seen grazing. One member wanders into the forest to find more food. It finds a field of flowers and begins grazing. It wanders in further and starts to be hunted by the same Tyrannosaurus rex. The Tyrannosaurus rex steps on a twig, which makes the Monoclonius wary. The Monoclonius lets out a trumpet to signal the herd, then, possibly curious, keeps walking deeper into the forest. It soon stumbles upon the remains of the Edmontosaurus killed by the Tyrannosaurus rex and becomes a little scared. While the Monoclonius ponders over the carcass, the Tyrannosaurus rex sneaks up from behind. The Tyrannosaurus rex begins the battle by attacking the Monoclonius and biting hard on its back. The Monoclonius manages to break free from its enemy's jaws and gores the Tyrannosaurus rex in its shin with its nasal horn, but this apparently enrages the Tyrannosaurus which then goes for broke and corners it near some trees. The Monoclonius lets out one last cry before it is presumably or possibly killed. The Monoclonius herd start to call out for their missing member, not knowing at first that it is killed. The Tyrannosaurus rex is last seen trying to find a place to sleep and digest its meal.

Inconsistency
The film is set 65 million years ago in what is now Alberta, in modern Canada. This is consistent with the presence of the carnivore dinosaur shown in the short if we consider that the carnivore corresponds to the genus Tyrannosaurus. Indeed, in the mid-1980s when the short was released, tyrannosaurs (including Tyrannosaurus, Albertosaurus, and Daspletosaurus)  were considered as an extant species in North America 65 million years before the present. It also is correctly depicted with two fingers on each hand. Currently, the Cretaceous–Paleogene extinction event that engaged the extinction of tyrannosaurs and other non-avian dinosaurs is admitted to have happened far before, approximately 66 million years ago.

However, the herbivore dinosaur in the short is a ceratopsian and it might be identified as a Monoclonius. But it also could be a Centrosaurus. Some scientists already have suggested that both genera, Monoclonius and Centrosaurus, are synonyms (the same dinosaur). Specimens of both genera, whether or not synonymised with Centrosaurus, are found in close stratigraphic ranges: from 77 million years ago (Ma) to 74.8 Ma for Monoclonius and from 76.5 Ma to 75.5 Ma for Centrosaurus. Even if considered as separated genera --not synonyms; not the same dinosaur-- Centrosaurus' temporal range is completely overlapped by Monoclonius' own temporal range (of course only in the cases when the affected fossil remains are attributed to Monoclonius). Whether or not Monoclonius is a synonym of Centrosaurus, none of them were extant populations of dinosaurs in the period where the short is set. This is 65 million years ago.

The temporal range of specimens in the Tyrannosaurus genus does not overlap with that of Monoclonius/Centrosaurus (even though these dinosaurs --Tyrannosaurus rex and Monoclonius/Centrosaurus-- both lived in North America in the upper Late Cretaceous). The latter spans in a stratigraphic range where several carnivore dinosaurs were morphologically very similar to Tyrannosaurus rex, sharing the same period and geographical area than Monoclonius/Centrosaurus. A few examples of such carnivore dinosaurs are the genera Daspletosaurus or Gorgosaurus (also called Albertosaurus). Thus, Prehistoric Beast cannot be considered as a scientifically consistent short film because even if the meat-eater shown in the film was assumed to be one of such tyrannosaurids, like Daspletosaurus or Gorgosaurus/Albertosaurus, for example, none of them lived 65 million years before the present day (which is the period back in time where the film's action is supposed to be set).

When some of these Prehistoric Beast sequences were added to the 1985 documentary Dinosaur!, Christopher Reeve, who hosted the show, named both animals respectively Monoclonius and Tyrannosaurus rex, thus being inconsistent. Nevertheless, it is worth mentioning that a 1993 Canadian documentary titled Dinosaurs: Messages in Stone reused special effects sequences from Dinosaur! and Prehistoric Beast under authorization. In the ending credits of Dinosaurs: Messages in Stone, the affected species by the reused sequences are mentioned as Edmontosaurus, Daspletosaurus (or Gorgosaurus/Albertosaurus), and Struthiomimus, thus being consistent for considering the meat-eater as a Daspletosaurus (or Gorgosaurus/Albertosaurus).

Prelude of a full-length documentaryPrehistoric Beast was only released in specialized animation festivals, but it convinced Robert Guenette and Steven Paul Mark to request Tippett's skills in order to transform it in a full-length documentary. They then asked Tippett to realize new sequences with other dinosaur species, and the Prehistoric Beast material was added to the new one, resulting on Dinosaur! in 1985. Tippett had already participated in The Empire Strikes Back (1980), animating the tauntauns seen in the film, and his experimental work on Prehistoric Beast and Dinosaur! served to the animated dinosaurs sequences he made some years later for Jurassic Park (1993).

Digital re-release
[[File:Phil Tippett Prehistoric Beast logo.jpg|thumb|Prehistoric Beasts logo]]
On April 6, 2011, the Tippett Studio had published on its YouTube official channel a digital restoration of the short.

Legacy
As with the subsequent documentary Dinosaur!, Phil Tippett, while making Prehistoric Beast, received assistance from ILM stop-motion animators Randy Dutra (who made the dinosaur molds and skins) and Tom St. Amand (who made the inner articulated metallic skeletons of the dinosaurs).

In the 1933 film King Kong, a Stegosaurus attacks the film characters and after having killed it by gun fire one of the characters identifies it as being "a prehistoric beast". This line, taken from the film, inspired Phil Tippett when giving a title to his 1984 animated short film. An excerpt from this King Kong scene is shown in the final 1985 documentary Dinosaur!, as a reference to Prehistoric Beast, the short sequence by which it was preceded.

References

External links
 
 

1980s historical films
1980s stop-motion animated films
Films about dinosaurs
Animated films without speech
1984 films
Films set in Alberta
Animated films about dinosaurs
Films directed by Phil Tippett
Films set in prehistory